Chaetocnema obesa is a species of black-coloured beetle from the family Chrysomelidae.

Distribution
The species can be found in Europe, except in Scandinavia, and Iberian peninsula. It can also be found in Central Asia, Caucasus, Iraq, Mongolia, Tibet, and Turkey. Its common in North Africa as well, in countries like Algeria and Tunisia.

References

Alticini
Beetles described in 1859
Beetles of North Africa
Beetles of Asia
Beetles of Europe
Insects of Central Asia